Karin Ek may refer to:
 Karin Ek (writer)
 Karin Ek (artist)